Voskresensky District is an administrative and municipal district (raion), one of the thirty-six in Moscow Oblast, Russia. It is located in the east of the oblast. Its administrative center is the town of Voskresensk. Population: 153,600 (2010 Census);  The population of Voskresensk accounts for 59.5% of the district's total population.

References

Notes

Sources

Districts of Moscow Oblast